Čestín is a municipality and village in Kutná Hora District in the Central Bohemian Region of the Czech Republic. It has about 400 inhabitants.

Administrative parts
Villages of Čenovice, Čentice, Kamenná Lhota, Kasanice, Kněž, Milotice, Morány and Polipsy are administrative parts of Čestín.

Geography
It lies mostly in the Upper Sázava Hills. The Čestínský Stream sprins here and flows across the municipality. The Sázava River briefly forms the southwestern municipal border.

History
The first written mention of Čestín is from around 1265, when it was named Čestín Kostel. In 1389, a fortress was built here. In 1579, Čestín was promoted to a town by Emperor Rudolf II. It ceased to be a town after World War II.

Sights
Čestlín has two landmarks, Čestín Castle and Church of Saints Peter and Paul. In 1575–1582, the original fortress was rebuilt to a large Renaissance castle by Adam Slavata of Chlum. The castle was partly demolished in the 19th century.

The Church of Saints Peter and Paul was built in the Neo-Romanesque style in 1859–1861. It replaced an old Romanesque church from the 13th century. The bells in the bell tower date from 1562.

Notable people
Vilém Slavata of Chlum (1572–1652), nobleman

References

External links

Villages in Kutná Hora District